Wow FM (100.7 FM, callsign "2WOW") is a community radio station based in St Marys in Sydney.  The station broadcasts to part of Western Sydney, mainly centered on the City of Penrith. Wow FM is a volunteer-run organisation and is funded through listener support, grants and limited commercial sponsorship.

Programming
The station's programs cover a range of music styles including adult contemporary, rock and roll, country, multicultural and Christian programming, although for vast parts of the day, relays satellite programming from the Community Radio Network (CRN). Wow FM also broadcasts programs that are presented by special interest groups or in languages other than English.

The station encourages all listeners to become members and to volunteer to present programs of interest to the community

History
In June 2001, "Way Out West (WOW) FM" beat one other radio station for a permanent license from the Australian Broadcasting Authority. This was due to the perceived need for multicultural programs in the Penrith area, which WOW FM devoted a large proportion of their airtime, although only 10% of Penrith LGA residents come from a non-English-speaking background.

In September 2001, 2WOW was a finalist for the Hillbilly Radio Station of the Year Award from the Australian Independent Country Music Awards, along with every other station that plays country music.

In November 2001, WOW FM began broadcasting national news updates produced in Bathurst by media students at Charles Sturt University.

WOW FM added a "Kids Club" feature that allows local primary school students to learn about radio broadcasting and promote their schools. The station joined the "Work for the Dole" project by giving thirty unemployed young people the chance to study interviewing, computer skills, and Internet broadcasting, and introduced new programs for refugees that have moved into the listening area.

See also
 List of radio stations in Australia

References

External links

Radio stations in Sydney
Community radio stations in Australia
Radio stations established in 2001